Tommy White (born March 2, 2003) is an American college baseball first baseman and designated hitter who plays for the LSU Tigers. He previously played for the NC State Wolfpack.

Amateur career
White grew up in St. Pete Beach, Florida and initially attended Calvary Christian High School. As a junior, he batted .444 with 18 RBIs and four home runs in 11 games before the season was cut short due to the coronavirus pandemic. He transferred to IMG Academy in Bradenton, Florida prior to his senior year. White batted .378 and was named an All-American in his only season at IMG.

White was named NC State's starting first baseman entering his freshman year. He garnered national attention after batting .588 with nine home runs in his first eight collegiate games. White set records for the most home runs by a NC State player and the most by a freshman in the Atlantic Coast Conference (ACC) since the introduction of the BBCOR standard for bats in 2011. He later hit his 23rd home run to break the overall ACC freshman home run record set by Florida State's Chris Diaz in 1998. White was named the ACC Freshman of the Year. After his freshman campaign, in which the Wolfpack failed to make the NCAA tournament despite a strong regular season, White entered the NCAA transfer portal.

White ultimately committed to transfer to Louisiana State.

References

External links

NC State Wolfpack bio
LSU Tigers bio

Living people
Baseball first basemen
Baseball players from Florida
IMG Academy alumni
LSU Tigers baseball players
NC State Wolfpack baseball players
Sportspeople from Pinellas County, Florida
All-American college baseball players
2003 births